Guazzo may refer to:
 Marco Guazzo (died 1566), Italian writer from Padua
 Stefano Guazzo (1530–1593),  Italian writer from Casale Monferrato
 Francesco Maria Guazzo (c. 1570 – c. 1630), teacher of theology and author of the witch-finders’ manual Compendium Maleficarum
 the Italian term for gouache